Euglesa hinzi is a species of mollusc belonging to the family Sphaeriidae.

It is native to Northern Europe.

Synonym:
 Pisidium hinzi Kuiper, 1975 (= basionym)

References

Sphaeriidae
Molluscs described in 1975